Akinwumi Ogundiran (born 1966) is a Nigerian-American archaeologist, anthropologist, and cultural historian, whose research focuses on the Yoruba world of western Africa, Atlantic Africa, and the African Diaspora. He is Chancellor's Professor and Professor of Africana Studies, Anthropology & History at UNC Charlotte.

Education 
Ogundiran received a BA, First Class Honors from Obafemi Awolowo University in 1988, followed by a MSc from the University of Ibadan in 1991. In 2000, he received a PhD from Boston University. His thesis was titled Settlement cycling and regional interactions in central Yorùbá-land, AD 1200-1900 : archaeology and history in Ìlàrè district, Nigeria.

Career 
Ogundiran taught at the Department of History at Florida International University, Miami. From 2008 to 2018 Ogundiran was Chair of the Africana Studies department at UNC Charlotte, where he is currently Chancellor's Professor and Professor of Africana Studies, Anthropology & History. His research addresses the archaeology of social complexity and cultural history in the Yoruba world of western Africa, especially questions of emergent communities, social complexity, and cultural history during the period 1000-1800 AD. Ogundiran has also facilitated collaborative research projects on the archaeology of Atlantic Africa and the African Diaspora. Other areas of work include Black Intellectual Thought, social sustainability, historiography, and cultural heritage.

From 1997 to 2000, Ogundiran directed the Eka Osun Project which studied regional interactions, historic landscape and social memory in Ilare District, Nigeria (1200–1900 CE). Between 2003 and 2011, he directed the Upper Osun Archaeological and Historical Project that investigates the cultural history of Atlantic Africa as experienced in the hinterlands of the Yoruba world, and the landscape history of the Osun Osogbo Sacred Grove. Most recently, he has been directing the Archaeology of Old Oyo Metropolis studying the political economy and social ecology of the Oyo Empire (1570-1836). His research has been funded by the National Humanities Center, the Wenner-Gren Foundation for Anthropological Research, the National Endowment for the Humanities,  the American Philosophical Society, National Geographic, among others. In spring 2018, he was a Yip Fellow at Magdalene College, University of Cambridge.

Ogundiran has authored and edited several publications. These include Materialities of Ritual in the Black Atlantic which was named the Choice Outstanding Academic Title for 2015. His latest book is "The Yoruba: A New History" (Indiana University Press, 2020), winner of the 2022 Vinson Sutlive Book Prize and a finalist for the Isaac Delano Prize in Yoruba Studies. He was awarded a Certificate of Special United States Congressional Recognition for Excellence in Service in 2007. In 2018, he received the Research Excellence Award from UNESCO-Affiliated Centre for Black Culture and International Understanding in Nigeria. He is the recipient of the 2021 First Citizens Bank Scholars Medal Award, UNC Charlotte's highest recognition for research excellence. Professor Ogundiran is a Member of the Nigerian Academy of Letters (MNAL).

He is currently editor-in-chief of the journal African Archaeological Review.

Selected publications 
 Archaeology and History in Ilare District, 1200-1900 (Cambridge Monograph in African Archaeology 55, 2002)
 Precolonial Nigeria (Africa World Press, 2005)
 Archaeology of Atlantic Africa and the African Diaspora (Indiana University Press, 2007)
 Power and Landscape in Atlantic West Africa (Cambridge University Press, 2012)
 Materialities of Ritual in the Black Atlantic (Indiana University Press, 2014)
 The Yoruba: A New History (Indiana University Press, 2020)

References 

1966 births
Living people
Nigerian archaeologists
University of North Carolina at Charlotte faculty
Boston University alumni
American people of Yoruba descent
American people of Nigerian descent
Yoruba academics
Yoruba historians
Obafemi Awolowo University alumni
University of Ibadan alumni
Historians of Yoruba
African-American historians
Florida International University faculty
21st-century African-American people
20th-century African-American people